Derek Schooley (born October 4,1970) is an American ice hockey head coach and former player. He was formerly the head coach for Robert Morris, a position he has held from 2004 until the program's disbandment in 2021.

Career
Hailing from St. Louis, Schooley was unheralded coming out of high school and spent a year with the Omaha Lancers under Frank Serratore. Schooley led the USHL in scoring by a defenseman for his lone season in the league, helping Omaha capture both the regular season and Championship titles, a first for Lancers. After being named to the USHL All-Star second team Schooley joined the program at Western Michigan.

Schooley played for the Broncos for four seasons, improving his point total each season, but remained a relatively unknown player outside of Kalamazoo. The Broncos had a fair amount of success while schooley was there, making two conference semifinals as well as only their second tournament appearance in 1994. After graduating with a degree in Communications Schooley embarked on a brief professional career, spending the 1994–95 season with the Huntington Blizzard before bouncing between four teams the following year. Schooley retires after four games in 1996-97 and joined the Chicago Freeze as both an assistant coach and scouting director.

Schooley returned to the college ranks in 1997 as an assistant for Cornell but left after a season to join his former junior coach Serratore at Air Force in a similar role. Schooley was assigned to coach the team's defense and twice set the program record for lowest goals against per game during his time there. After serving as an assistant on the USA under-18 team at the junior world cup and a year later found himself promoted to associate head coach of the Falcons.

In the summer of 2004 Robert Morris University announced that they were adding several new sports as fully funded programs, including men's ice hockey. Two days after the press conference Schooley was signed on as the team's new head coach. Robert Morris joined the CHA straight away due to the conference having just lost Findlay after their program was demoted to club status. The Colonials finished in last place their first season, but only one point behind Air Force in the conference standings. Over the next four seasons Schooley led to the team to an increasing win total, topping out at 15 in 2007–08 with his first graduating class of seniors. The Colonials dipped a bit in the two years following but while Schooley was building his program, his conference was collapsing.

The CHA had lost Air Force to Atlantic Hockey in 2006 while Wayne State shuttered their program two years later. With only four teams left the conference was on its last legs (NCAA bylaws stipulated that conferences needed to have a minimum of six teams to qualify for an automatic tournament bid). When Bemidji State left for the WCHA in 2010 two of the remaining three schools joined Atlantic Hockey and the CHA was disbanded.

The Colonials found a new level of success in their new home, posting their first winning season in 2010–11 and continued the upwards swing by taking their first conference tournament title in 2014. Robert Morris' first appearance in the NCAA tournament saw them pitted against #1 seed Minnesota where they predictable lost. Schooley's team followed up their surprising season by capturing the Atlantic Hockey regular season crown in 2015, going 24-8-5 and a second the following year. Unfortunately Robert Morris was unable to win the conference tournament in either of those years and was left out of the NCAA championship. Schooley's teams have finished as conference runner-ups in each of the last three seasons (as of 2018).

Head coaching record

References

External links

1970 births
Living people
American ice hockey coaches
American men's ice hockey defensemen
Air Force Falcons men's ice hockey coaches
Cornell Big Red men's ice hockey coaches
Flint Generals (CoHL) players
Huntington Blizzard players
Omaha Lancers players
Pensacola Ice Pilots players
Peoria Rivermen (ECHL) players
Quad City Mallards (CoHL) players
Roanoke Express players
Robert Morris Colonials men's ice hockey coaches
Western Michigan Broncos men's ice hockey players
Ice hockey people from St. Louis